Unterberg may refer to:

Places

Germany
 a village in the municipality of Ampfing, Bavaria, Mühldorf am Inn District
 a village in the municipality of Anger, Upper Bavaria
 a village in the municipality of Kirchdorf an der Amper, Bavaria, Freising District
 a village in the municipality of Leichlingen, North Rhine-Westphalia, Solingen District
 a village in the municipality of Schaufling, Bavaria, Deggendorf District

 a village in the municipality of Wermelskirchen, North Rhine-Westphalia, Rheinisch-Bergischer Kreis
 a village in the municipality of Küps, Bavaria, Kronach District
 a village in the municipality of Birstein in Hesse, Main-Kinzig-Kreis
 a village in the municipality of Pfaffenhofen an der Roth, Baden-Württemberg, Neu-Ulm District
 a village in the municipality of Berg, Baden-Württemberg, Ravensburg District
 a village in the municipality of Beckum, North Rhine-Westphalia, name of a farmstead there

Austria
 Unterberg (Steindorf), village in the municipality of Bodensdorf, Steindorf am Ossiacher See, Carinthia
 Unterberg (Bodensdorf), village in the municipality of Oberglan,  Feldkirchen in Carinthia 
 Unterberg (Abtenau), near Abtenau, Hallein District, Salzburg
 Unterberg (Dorfgastein), near Dorfgastein, St. Johann i.P. District, Salzburg
 Unterberg (Ebenau), near Ebenau, Hangsiedlung, Salzburg-Umgebung District

 Unterberg (Großarl), near Großarl, St. Johann i.P. District, Salzburg
 Unterberg (Maria Alm), near Maria Alm, Zell am See District, Salzburg
 Unterberg (Niedernsill), near Niedernsill, Zell am See District, Salzburg
 Unterberg (Strobl), near Strobl, Salzburg District 
 Unterberg (Brandenberg), near Brandenberg, Kufstein District, Tyrol
 Unterberg (Mutters), near Schönberg im Stubaital, Innsbruck-Land District, Tyrol

 Unterberg (Steinberg), near Steinberg am Rofan, Schwaz District, Tyrol
 Unterberg (Zell am Ziller), near Zell am Ziller, Schwaz District, Tyrol

Switzerland
 a village in the municipality of Berg SG, Kanton St. Gallen
 a village in the municipality of Fraubrunnen, Kanton Bern
 a village in the municipality of Seelisberg, Kanton Uri

Other countries
a place in Kwidzyn (German: Marienwerder), Poland, Voivodship of Pommern

Mountains and hills
 Unterberghorn (Unterberg summit), 1773 m, Kitzbühel District (Tyrol)
 Unterberg (Lower Austria), 1342 m, Lilienfeld District
 Unterberg (Tyrol), 1187 m, Kitzbühel District, Loferer Steinberge

See also
 Underberg (disambiguation)
 Unternberg
 Untersberg, the northernmost massif of the Berchtesgaden Alps